The Movement for Autonomous Democracy–Party for Moravia and Silesia (HSD–SMS) was a political party in Czechoslovakia and the Czech Republic that sought autonomy for Moravia.

History
The party was established on 4 April 1990, and was initially led by Boleslav Bárta. In the elections to the Czechoslovakian Federal Assembly in June it won nine seats in the Chamber of the People and seven in the Chamber of the Nations. In the simultaneous elections to the National Council of the Czech Republic the party won 23 seats, making it the third largest party in the Council. The party was part of Petr Pithart's coalition government between 1990 and 1992. Bárta died in 1991 and was replaced by Jan Kryčer.

In the federal elections in 1992 the party lost all its seats in both chambers of the Federal Assembly, whilst the Czech elections saw it reduced to 14 seats.

In 1993 the party was renamed the Movement for Self-Governing Democracy of Moravia and Silesia (Hnutí samosprávné demokracie Moravy a Slezska). After the liberal wing of the party came to power the following year, the party became the Moravian Centre Party (Českomoravskou stranu středu). In December 1994 it formed an alliance with the Liberal-Social Union and the Agrarian Party named the Moravian Centre Union, and formally merged into a single political party in February 1996. The new party failed to win a seat in the 1996 elections.

Election results

Czech National Council

Local Elections

References

Defunct political parties in the Czech Republic
Political parties established in 1990
Political parties in Czechoslovakia
Political parties disestablished in 1996
Regionalist parties in the Czech Republic
1990 establishments in Czechoslovakia
1996 disestablishments in the Czech Republic